Solarlite CSP Technology GmbH, located in Mecklenburg-Pomerania, Germany, develops and builds decentralized solar-thermal parabolic trough power plants (CSP – Concentrated Solar Power) and process heat plants. For the first time worldwide, Solarlite is using direct steam generation commercially in a power plant. In 2012, Solarlite declared insolvency. The company was reincorporated the next year by Joachim Krüger (CEO).

Technology 

Solar thermal facilities offer one of the most sustainable forms of energy recovery in terms of the environment, resources and availability. The technology has the advantage that as direct solar radiation increases, so does the efficiency of the facilities. The facilities are also characterized by a high degree of flexibility. They can be combined with all other fossil and renewable energy sources and are thus base-load capable. Another plus is the option of producing electricity and process heat at the same time or independently of one another. In addition, the residual heat can be used for further industrial applications for example desalination and cooling.

Solarlite has tested the DSG concept successfully in three pilot projects in Thailand and Germany. The DSG concept is environment friendly and allows significant reductions of the total investment costs and levelized electricity cost. With DSG a higher operating temperature will be achievable.

The Solarlite SL 4600 parabolic trough is a highly efficient product that can generate temperatures of up to 400 °C. Each panel has an aperture width of 4,6 m and is made of composite materials combined with an efficient thin glass mirror. This mirror reflects up to 95% of the sun's radiation onto the absorber pipe positioned at the ideal focus of the parabolic mirror.

Bankruptcy 

In 2012, Solarlite was forced to declare insolvency. According to BonVenture, the reason for this "...was the unexpected market shift towards photovoltaics because of the Chinese government´s subsidies policy and the non-fulfilment of contractual obligations and payments by two customers".  The company then reincorporated on January 1, 2013, as Solarlite CSP Technology GmbH with the same CEO, Joachim Krüger.

Projects 

 "TSE 1" Kanchanaburi Province, Thailand  Completed in 2011, this was the first of what was originally planned to be 15 9MWe concentrated solar power plants. Thailand’s Solar Programme required that the plants be completed by 2015. However, due to complications, including Solarlite filing for bankruptcy in 2012, no other plants were built. The 5 MWe solar thermal power plant located in Kanchanaburi/Thailand is unique in three different ways: 1). First parabolic trough commercial power plant based on direct steam generation; 2.) Solarlite Trough SL4600 a new generation of parabolic trough made of composite material combined with an efficient thin-glass mirror which reflects more than 95% of the sun radiation; 3.) The construction method allows island solutions and smaller solar thermal parabolic trough plants starting from 500 kWe.
 DUKE, Spain
 CompoSol
 Solarlite, Duckwitz / DLR
 TRESERT, Thailand
 Woltow, Germany

Direct steam generation
Solarlite has tested the DSG concept successfully in three pilot projects in Thailand and Germany. Solarlite’s adaptation of DSG concept is based on the following advantages: 	
 DSG concept is environment friendly and it avoids usage of flammable and environmental hazard materials
 The DSG allows significant reductions of the total investment costs and levelized electricity cost.
 With DSG a higher operating temperature will be achievable.
 The DSG concepts has already acceptance at financial institutes, the first power plant was financed.

Direct steam generation 2.0
Flow path concept, development and testing  In a joint research project known as “Duke” that was supported by the German Federal Ministry for the Environment, Nature Conservation and Nuclear Safety, Solarlite CSP Technology GmbH and the German Aerospace Centre tested a new version of direct steam generation.
Project aim
 Investigation of the flow path concept under real conditions
 Demonstration of solar direct steam generation at 500 °C
 Detailed system analysis for debitable costing under consideration of the Solarlite collector

SL 4600+
The Solarlite 4600 parabolic trough is a newly developed highly efficient product that can generate temperatures of up to 400 °C. Each panel has an aperture width of 4.6 m and is made of composite materials combined with an efficient thin glass mirror. This mirror reflects up to 95% of the sun’s radiation onto the receiver pipe positioned at the ideal focus of the parabolic mirror. Water passing through the receiver pipe is heated up by the concentrated reflected sun radiation and is converted into steam within a controlled process. A turbine generator produces electricity. Residual heat can be used for other applications such as seawater desalination or absorption cooling.
The basic element of the Solarlite 4600 collector is the Solarlite composite panel which has a dimension of 2.3 m width and 1 m length. These panels are combined together to form 1 segment with a dimension 4.6 m aperture width and 12 m length. It is possible to connect 10 of these segments to form one collector thus reaching up to 120 m. These collectors are combined together to form rows (collectors aligned in 1 axis in the North-South direction) and loops (collectors connected in series where the cold fluid enters in one end and the hot fluids leaves in the other end). The collector is moved from east to west to track the sun by means of a hydraulic drive system. The modular concept of Solarlite allows choosing the optimal length of the collector based on the specific locations’ wind data. The combination of the light weight composite and slender steel structure allows having a reduced specific weight compared to the competitors.

Awards and nominations
 Die Finalisten des Deutsche Innovationspreises.
 CSP Today Award:Solarlite GmbH was a Newcomer of the year finalist in 2010.
 National Energy Globe Award Thailand 2012
 Step Award 2011 in den Kategorien Produkt und Technologie und Nachhaltigkeit

References
 Parabolrinnen für Prozeswärme-Projekte und Entwicklungen.
 Parabolic trough solar collector and their applications
 The secret of success
 Case study Zero Campus Design, University of Minnesota
 16. Kölner Sonnenkolloquium
 Klimaretter

Footnotes

External links
 http://www.solarlite.de
 http://www.mss-csp.info/companies
 http://www.seao2.com/solarsphere/csp.htm
 http://www.nrel.gov/csp/solarpaces/project_detail.cfm/projectID=207

Solar thermal energy